Terry Davey (born 23 July 1950) is a former Australian rules footballer who played with Melbourne in the Victorian Football League (VFL).

Notes

External links 		
		
		

1950 births
Living people
Australian rules footballers from Victoria (Australia)
Melbourne Football Club players